The 2004 World Junior Figure Skating Championships were held at the De Uithof in The Hague, Netherlands between February 29 and March 7. Junior age eligible figure skaters competed for the title of World Junior Champion in men's singles, ladies' singles, pair skating, and ice dancing.

Due to the large number of participants, the men's and ladies' qualifying groups were split into groups A and B. The ice dancing qualifying event was split into two groups as well, with both groups doing the same dances in the same order. Group B skated their first and second dances one after the other, then Group A skated their first and second, in the same order. The first compulsory dance was the Quickstep and the second was the Paso Doble.

Medals table

Results

Men

Ladies

Pairs

Ice dancing

External links
 2004 World Junior Figure Skating Championships

World Junior Figure Skating Championships
World Junior Figure Skating Championships, 2004
F
World Junior 2004